Chbar Ampov (meaning "Sugarcane Garden") is a district (khan) in central Phnom Penh, Cambodia.

Formed in December 2013 by splitting eight communes from neighbouring Khan Mean Chey, Chbar Ampov is located on the east of Phnom Penh, and is separated from the city by the Bassac river.

Administration 
Chbar Ampov is subdivided into 8 Sangkats and 30 Villages.

Transport 
As of mid 2022, only the Monivong Bridge on National Road 1 links the Chbar Ampov to the capital. A second bridge is under construction to the north of the Monivong bridge and will span the Bassac river linking the Koh Norea island development to Koh Pich in Tonle Basac district, and a third bridge, the Prek Talong bridge is proposed, connecting Sangkat Prek Pra and Sangat Chak Angre Kraom in Mean Chey district.

Education 
Chbar Ampov has a growing number of private International and public state schools catering for the areas growing population.

Private schools include:
 British International School of Phnom Penh in Chong Prek, Sangkat Prek Aeng.
 Southbridge International School Cambodia (SISC) within Peng Huoth's borey The Star Platinum Polaris I, in Sangkat Nirouth.
 CIA FIRST International School, Chbar Ampov in Beung Chhuk Village, Sangkat Nirouth
 Sovannaphumi School in Russei Sros Village, Sangkat Nirouth.
 Paññāsāstra International School (PSIS) in Deum Ampil, Sangkat Chbar Ampov I.
 BELTEI International School in Deum Ampil, Sangkat Chbar Ampov I.

Images

References

Districts of Phnom Penh